The WTA 125K series is the secondary professional tennis circuit organised by the Women's Tennis Association. The 2019 WTA 125K series calendar consists of eleven tournaments, each with a total prize fund of $125,000 except the Oracle Challenger Series that offers $162,480 in prize money. Starting from 2019, Zhengzhou Open was upgraded to a WTA Premier level event while the Mumbai Open was cancelled due to elections in the city. The Oracle Challenger event in Chicago was replaced by another one in New Haven. Three new Challenger events were introduced in Guadalajara, Båstad and Karlsruhe.



Schedule

Statistical information 
These tables present the number of singles (S) and doubles (D) titles won by each player and each nation during the season.  The players/nations are sorted by: 1) total number of titles (a doubles title won by two players representing the same nation counts as only one win for the nation); 2) a singles > doubles hierarchy; 3) alphabetical order (by family names for players).

To avoid confusion and double counting, these tables should be updated only after an event is completed.

Titles won by player

Titles won by nation

Points distribution

References 

 
2019 in women's tennis
2019